Richard Beer-Hofmann (11 July 1866 in Vienna – 26 September 1945 in New York City) was an Austrian dramatist and poet.

Beer-Hofmann was born to Jewish parents. His mother died within a week of his birth and after her death, he was adopted and reared by his uncle and his aunt, Bertha and Alois Hofmann. He spent his early childhood in Brünn (Brno, Czech Republic), where Alois Hofmann owned a textile factory. In 1880 the family moved to Vienna and Richard Beer-Hofmann finished his schooling at the Akademisches Gymnasium. In the 1880s he studied law in Vienna, receiving his doctorate in 1890. In the same year of his graduation, he became acquainted with the writers Hugo von Hofmannsthal, Hermann Bahr and Arthur Schnitzler, with whom he shared a long friendship and membership in the Junge Wien (Young Vienna) literary movement. He consequently began his literary activities as a freelance writer.

Beer-Hofmann married Paula Lissy in 1897. Their daughter Miriam Beer-Hofmann Lens was born in the same year.

At first Beer-Hofmann wrote novellas, later moving on to short stories and poetry. In the 1920s he worked as a theatre director for Max Reinhardt, a role which continued until 1932. In 1939 Beer-Hofmann emigrated from Austria, and traveled to New York via Zurich. His wife, Paula, died in Switzerland. Subsequently, his works were banned in Austria and Germany. In 1945 he became a United States citizen, but died that same year.

Beer-Hofmann's literary output consists primarily of novellas, dramas, and poems. It can be considered part of the literary current of the Wiener Moderne. Beer-Hofmann received several notable literary awards, including the Volksschillerpreis in 1905 in Germany and the award of the National Institute of Arts and Letters in 1945 in the United States. One year after his death the Beer-Hofmann Society was created in New York.
Richard Beer-Hofmann's  as well as his daughter's papers can be found in the Leo Baeck Institute Archives. In addition to the Richard Beer-Hofmann Collection (AR 745) and the Miriam Beer-Hofmann Lens Collection (AR 7258), there is a research collection (AR 25593) of the literary historian Richard M. Sheirich's papers at the Leo Baeck Archive. Sheirich's collection sheds light on Beer-Hofmann's preparation for discussing Jewish topics in his works as well as his daughter's efforts to keep her father's as one of the most important modern literary author's memory.

Works 
Novellen
Der Tod Georgs
Der Graf von Charolais
Gedenkrede auf Wolfgang Amadée Mozart
Trilogy “Die Historie von König David” (uncompleted)
Jakobs Traum
Der junge David
Paula. Ein Fragment
Verse
Schlaflied für Mirjam

References

External links 
 
 
 
 Guide to the Papers of Richard Beer-Hofmann at the Leo Baeck Institute, New York, NY
 The Papers of Richard M. Scheirich (held at the Leo Baeck Institute, New York, NY) also contain original letters and photographs of Beer-Hofmann and his family.

See also

 The Holocaust in Austria
 Vugesta
 List of claims for restitution for Nazi-looted art

1866 births
1945 deaths
Austro-Hungarian Jews
Jewish Austrian writers
Jewish emigrants from Austria to the United States after the Anschluss
19th-century Austrian dramatists and playwrights
20th-century Austrian dramatists and playwrights
19th-century Austrian novelists
20th-century Austrian novelists
19th-century Austrian poets
20th-century Austrian poets
Austrian male dramatists and playwrights
Austrian male poets
Austrian male novelists